The New Zealand DG and DH class locomotive were a type of diesel-electric locomotives in operation on New Zealand's rail network from 1955-1983, built by English Electric.

Introduction
Due a change in NZR's dieselisation strategy the original order for 21 DF class locomotives was changed to 42 DG class locomotives, being a half-sized version of the DF with only one cab instead of two, and a similar Bulldog nose. English Electric, as they did with many of their diesel locomotives of the 1950s-60s, did not assemble them at the Preston works, but allocated the final assembly of build numbers 2254/E7821-2273/E7840 (NZR road numbers 750-769) to Robert Stephenson & Hawthorns and build numbers 2274/D353-2295/D374 (NZR road numbers 770-791) to Vulcan Foundry, both English Electric plants.

In service 
The first regular outing by a DG class locomotive was that of DG 750 in August 1955 when it was sent with 88-seater railcar RM 100, an English Electric DF class locomotive, and a newly arrived Drewry DSB class shunting locomotive to the Wanganui Industrial Fair. Shortly after the class took over workings in the Wairarapa area following the completion of the Rimutaka Tunnel and also the Murupara Branch from the older DE class. These locomotives usually worked in multiple as they were relatively low-powered, although they did occasionally run on their own.

With the arrival of enough DA class locomotives in the North Island, the DG locomotives from the North Island were transferred progressively south with the introduction of the rail ferry  in 1962, with this process completed by 1976. As a result, the DH class locomotives were converted to DG class standards in 1968 and received the DG classification, allowing the DH classification to be re-used in 1978.

With the introduction of DJ class locomotives from 1968 the class was usually relegated to "slave" status. The introduction of the new DF class further displaced the class.

Renumbering 
The introduction of the Traffic Monitoring System (TMS) in 1979 saw the locomotives renumbered DG2007 - DG2497.

Rebuilds
In the late 1970s, the DG class was reaching the end of its designated working life with a litany of problems:
 Mechanical and electrical failures were occurring on a regular basis.
 The EE 6SKRT engine blocks were cracking due to premature wear.
 Working conditions on the locomotives were known to be poor as well. There were no crew amenities, and the cabs were draughty.

In an attempt to modernise the DG class and extend the working lives of the locomotives, Chief Mechanical Engineer Graham Alecock was requested to prepare a plan to equip the DG class locomotives with new cabs that would be more crew-friendly and improved equipment. The decision was taken to rebuild DG 760 (renumbered DG2111 with the introduction of the Traffic Monitoring System), then due for an overhaul at Hillside Workshops as the prototype for the rebuilds. DG 760 was released from Hillside in August 1978 and was placed into service as the first of an eventual ten rebuilds to be completed between 1978 and the end of the program in 1980, when DG2330 was released for service in November 1980. The upgrades were intended to extend the life of the locomotives for ten to fifteen years, but all rebuilds were withdrawn from service by 1983 due to continual reliability issues, and the arrival of new locomotives.

The new cab was designed in-house by NZR, who then took the unusual step of contracting NZR's Westport Workshops to build them on Hillside's behalf. This led to some problems with fitting cabs to the locomotives. The cab itself was larger than the original DG cab, which required the low nose at the front to be shortened. The whole assembly had a pronounced box-like shape, with 45° angles to the cab roof and low nose. The new cab featured four windscreens to the original three, while the low nose had a larger doorway to access the new Westinghouse 26L air-brake equipment and also gave provision for a short walkway on either side of the nose. The small windows were the same as used on the DX class locomotives to improve standardisation on locomotives.

Mechanically, the locomotive's front traction motor blower was shifted to a position above the main generator, while new thermostat valves were fitted in an attempt to prevent the overheating problems that had plagued the locomotives under load. The original Westinghouse A7EL brake system was replaced by the more modern 26L system, actuated by a new push-button console in the cab. The traction motors were also upgraded, while welding repairs were conducted on the 6SKRT engine blocks. Several blocks were later sent to the United States for repairs using the Metalock treatment; this was later deemed to be a failure as the blocks again cracked and the Metalock treatment was seen as a waste of money.

The rebuilt locomotives also underwent several minor changes. Steps were fitted to the rear of the locomotives to allow access to the roof, external door handles and step-ladders were fitted to the middle set of engine-room doors, and an automated handbrake system was fitted. The locomotives also had front ladders fitted to allow access to the cab windows, some of which were integrated into the sheet metal profile edge from the locomotive frame to the leading headstock. Both horns were relocated to the front of the cab, although the rebuilt DG 760 had three - two forward facing on the cab front, with one behind the cab.

While the railway unions - the Locomotive Engineers Association (LEA) and the Engine-drivers, Firemen and Cleaners Association (EFCA) - were pleased with the cab design which took into consideration their input from the early design phases, the locomotive was not mechanically successful. Traction motor and engine problems still occurred, as well as occasional electrical faults. The locomotives were put into service hauling freight trains on the Main South Line and occasionally the Midland Line. Although the new cabs were designed with the Otago Central Railway in mind, very few of the re-cabbed locomotives ever worked this line.

Ten further DG class locomotives - nine built by Vulcan Foundry and one by RS&H - were given "A-grade" overhauls to work as trailing B-units for the rebuilt locomotives. These locomotives did not receive new cabs, and as such were not to be driven in regular service. A number of other locomotives of this type also received the updated Westinghouse 26L brake system and NZR designed push-button control stand.

The class continued to suffer from reliability issues brought about by electrical and mechanical failures, and were later prohibited from running in multiple with the Mitsubishi DJ and General Motors DF locomotives, although they did sometimes run with the DJ class past this time. It was decided to start withdrawing those locomotives that had not been overhauled to provide parts for those that had, and so the first to be withdrawn, DG 765, was withdrawn on the fact it had a good engine block.

Withdrawals 
By 1983, most of the original-cabbed DG class had been withdrawn, while the re-cabbed locomotives continued in service until they either suffered a mechanical failure, required major repairs or were withdrawn serviceable and placed in storage. On 28 August 1983, NZR operated a "Farewell to the DG Class" excursion between Christchurch and Arthur's Pass on the Midland line. Hauled by re-cabbed DG2007 and unrebuilt DG2468, the first and last DG class locomotives respectively, the excursion marked the end of the original DG class in regular service. The following month, DG2007 failed when it threw a con rod through the engine block and was placed in storage, while DG2468 was sold to the Weka Pass Railway shortly after.

The Dunedin machinery dealers W. Rietveld Limited were contracted by New Zealand Railways in 1983 to scrap the re-cabbed DG class locomotives, which were then stored at Dunedin. These locomotives were largely unserviceable due to mechanical failures or had been laid up with the arrival of more modern motive power. Several of these locomotives had been lifted by NZR in order to gain access to their EE 525 traction motors, which had been sold to the National Federation of Railway Societies for distribution to other groups who owned DG class locomotives.

Rietveld used the former sidings at Pelichet Bay to house the withdrawn locomotives while they were stripped of all useful parts. The hulks would then be forwarded to Sims-PMI for scrapping at their Dunedin premises. The first four locomotives to be moved to Pelichet Bay were numbers 2036, 2140, 2105, and 2347. They were followed several months later by numbers 2007, 2290, 2111 and 2439. The last two, DG 2128 and DG 2330, remained at Dunedin Locomotive Depot for a time after that as Rietveld hoped to sell them to an overseas concern. This did not eventuate, and the two locomotives were towed to Pelichet Bay for stripping - the last two re-cabbed DG class to exist.

Several of the unique cabs from these locomotives were not scrapped but instead removed intact by Rietvelds, who in 2001 held several at their Abbotsford reclaim site, including that of DG2007. The cab of DG2140 was purchased by Darryl Bond, part-owner of DG2376.

Preservation

With the phasing out of the DG class in the early 1980s, several locomotives were purchased for preservation:

DG 770/DG2232 was saved by the Weka Pass Railway in 1983. In 1988, the railway had their name painted to the rear of the cab door in place of its TMS number, although it retained their 'International Orange' livery. In 1995, the locomotive was taken out of service due to a due to a cracked bogie. A bogie from DG 783 was fully overhauled and fitted to 770. In 1997, the locomotive was repainted into the traditional NZR red with larch yellow nose stripes on the nose of the locomotive, as it was introduced. It was taken out of service in 2014 so its four-cylinder air compressor could be replaced but has returned to service. The locomotive, along with 791, can be seen when fire bans are in place, or when A 428 is out of service.
DG 772/ DG 2255 was saved by the Diesel Traction Group in 1983. In 1988, 772 was repainted into the traditional NZR red with larch yellow nose stripes on the nose of the locomotive (as it was introduced) for the Rail 125 celebrations, during which it hauled its first excursion train with DE 511 to Springfield and return. During the early 1990s, it also hauled a few more excursion including on the Otago Central Railway and on the Midland Line. In 1995, 772 was then placed on loan to the Weka Pass Railway to cover for their DG 770 while it was out of service for repairs. It was then placed into storage between the mid to late 1990s, the locomotive was placed into storage until 2002 when it was decided to overhaul the locomotive to current mainline standards. as part of this, the locomotive's Westinghouse A7EL brake system was replaced by the newer 26L system, and it was fitted with ditch lights, a VHF radio and an events recorder to allow it to run on the main line. The overhaul was completed in 2009, just in time of the 125th anniversary of the Otago Central Railway. Before it was sent south for the anniversary, the 'DG' was leased to the Weka Pass Railway for running-in purposes. The locomotive has run several excursions since then, as well it has occasionally been seen running on the Ferrymead Railway at the Ferrymead Heritage Park.
DG 783/ DG2376 was saved by Roger Redward for his proposed Southern Rail museum in Prebbleton. In 1988, the NZR decided to re-possess all of Rogers collection held on NZR property as he had failed to make several rent payments. The locomotive was sold in 1988 to the Weka Pass Railway, who was at the time seeking spare parts to maintain their two locomotives, and had the locomotive trucked to their Waipara yard where it was gradually stripped of most of its useful parts. In 2005, Weka Pass decided to sell the remains of the locomotive with the condition that it was removed from Waipara after purchase. The locomotive was subsequently purchased by two railfans, Darryl Bond and Evan Batchelor, who had the derelict locomotive moved to the Ferrymead Heritage Park, where it was planned to restore the locomotive. The locomotives front bogie (fitted with the cracked bogie ex-DG 770) has since been repaired, the body largely de-rusted, and parts have been acquired to begin to restore the locomotive to service in the later International Orange livery, which the locomotive never carried in service. It is planned to be fitted with the new cab from DG2140. In late 2013, the locomotive was moved to Oamaru.
DG 791/ DG2468 was also saved by the Weka Pass Railway in 1983. In 1988, the railway had their name painted to the rear of the cab door in place of its TMS number, although it retained their 'International Orange' livery. In 1997, the DG was repainted into the traditional NZR red with larch yellow nose stripes on the nose of the locomotive (as it was introduced). The locomotive, along with 770, can be seen when fire bans are in place, or when A 428 is out of service.

In addition:
DG 789/ DG2445 was considered to be added to the NZR's Heritage Fleet at the time. However, the locomotive had a cracked engine block, which did not fit with their policy of operating Heritage Fleet locomotives. Due to the extent of the cracking, it was decided to be uneconomic to repair, and so the locomotive was scrapped by Sims Pacific Metal Industries in Dunedin.
DG 790/ DG2451 was also saved by Roger Redward, but it was later scrapped after the locomotive became a casualty of a protracted dispute between himself and the NZR

References

Footnotes

Citations

Bibliography

External links
 Diesel Traction Group

DG class
English Electric locomotives
A1A-A1A locomotives
Railway locomotives introduced in 1955